Sylvain Privé (born 27 March 1970 in Montmorency, Val-d'Oise) was a French figure skater who competed in pairs.

With partner Line Haddad, Privé won the gold medal at the 1992 French Figure Skating Championships and finished 16th at the 1992 Winter Olympics.

References

External links
 

1970 births
Living people
People from Montmorency, Val-d'Oise
Sportspeople from Val-d'Oise
French male pair skaters
Olympic figure skaters of France
Figure skaters at the 1992 Winter Olympics